"Someone to Love" is a song by Jon B. from his debut album Bonafide. Released as the first single from the album on April 3, 1995, the song is a duet with Babyface that gained wide exposure on the Bad Boys soundtrack.

The song, with a style very much inspired by Babyface, peaked at number 10 on the US Hot 100 chart and at number 7 on the US R&B chart and was also certified gold by the RIAA.

The song received a Grammy Award nomination for the category Best Pop Collaboration with Vocals in 1996. The then 21-year-old Jon B. stated he felt the nomination was "an honor he could not have asked for."

Personnel and credits
Credits adapted from the liner notes of Bonafide.

Jon B. – lead vocals, background vocals, keyboard
Babyface – lead vocals, background vocals, writer, producer, arranger, piano, drum programming
Reggie Hamilton – guitar
Randy Walker – MIDI programming
Brad Gilderman – recording engineer
Jon Gass – mix engineer

Charts

Weekly charts

Year-end charts

Certifications

References

550 Music singles
1995 songs
1995 debut singles
1990s ballads
Jon B. songs
Babyface (musician) songs
Song recordings produced by Babyface (musician)
Songs written by Babyface (musician)
Pop ballads
Contemporary R&B ballads
Soul ballads
Male vocal duets